Sadiq Mohammad (born 3 May 1945) is a former Pakistani cricketer and younger brother of the Pakistani batsmen Hanif and Mushtaq Mohammad. His Test debut was the first Test between Pakistan and New Zealand in 1969, and he played his final Test in the 4th Test against the West Indies in 1981. He played county cricket for Gloucestershire. Sadiq also coached the Pakistan cricket team to bronze at the 2010 Asian Games. He umpired in one ODI game in 2000.

As a child he attended the Church Mission School (CMS) in Karachi.

See also
 List of One Day International cricket umpires

References

External links

1945 births
Living people
People from Junagadh
Pakistani cricketers
Pakistan One Day International cricketers
Pakistan Test cricketers
Gloucestershire cricketers
International Cavaliers cricketers
Cricketers at the 1975 Cricket World Cup
Cricketers at the 1979 Cricket World Cup
Tasmania cricketers
Karachi cricketers
Pakistan International Airlines cricketers
United Bank Limited cricketers
Essex cricketers
Cornwall cricketers
Cricketers from Karachi
Karachi Blues cricketers
Karachi Whites cricketers
Pakistan Eaglets cricketers
Pakistani One Day International cricket umpires
Church Mission School alumni
Pakistani people of Gujarati descent
D. B. Close's XI cricketers
D. H. Robins' XI cricketers